USS Corry (DD/DDR-817) was a  of the United States Navy, the third Navy ship named for Lieutenant Commander William M. Corry, Jr. (1889–1920), a naval aviator who was posthumously awarded the Medal of Honor.

Corry was launched on 28 July 1945 by Consolidated Steel Corp. of Texas, Orange, Texas; sponsored by Miss Corry; commissioned on 27 February 1946 and reported to the Atlantic Fleet.

Service history
Corry sailed from Galveston, Texas, on 28 March 1946 for shakedown training in the Caribbean Sea, and arrived at Norfolk, Virginia, on 10 July. Following a tour of duty in European waters and the Mediterranean Sea from 23 July 1946 to 19 March 1947, Corry conducted Reserve training cruises from the Potomac River Naval Command, then reported to Pensacola, Florida, to serve as plane guard for aircraft carriers operating off Florida from 22 September 1947 to 28 April 1950.

Corry joined Destroyer Squadron 8 (DesRon 8) at Norfolk 22 May 1950 for antisubmarine exercises which included a cruise to Quebec in July. From 2 September to 12 November she served with the 6th Fleet in the Mediterranean, and joined a midshipman cruise to northern Europe, visiting Gotesburg and Cherbourg, France, from 1 June to 27 July 1951. Her next tour of duty with the 6th Fleet was from 22 April to 23 October 1952. Corry sailed out of Norfolk for local operations until 1 April 1953 when she was decommissioned for conversion to a radar picket destroyer. She was reclassified DDR-817, 9 April 1953.

Recommissioned 9 January 1954, Corry carried NROTC midshipmen on a cruise to New Orleans, Louisiana, and through the Panama Canal for operations at Balboa in the summer of 1954. From September 1954 through 1960 Corry alternated four tours of duty with the 6th Fleet in the Mediterranean with operations out of Norfolk along the east coast, and exercises in the Caribbean.

Corry reverted to DD-817 on 1 January 1964.

1964–1981

Corry performed a Western Pacific cruise from September 1968 to April 1969 in support of US forces in Vietnam. The ship sailed  round trip out of Norfolk, Virginia. While supporting US forces during the Vietnam War, the ship fired 6,607 5"38 cal rounds, destroyed 72 structures and bunkers with 15 known enemy kills.

Corry was decommissioned and struck from the Naval Vessel Register on 27 February 1981.

Greek service 

The ship was transferred to Greece on 8 July 1981, and served in the Hellenic Navy as Kriezis (D217). She was stricken in 1994. On 8 April 2002 the ship was removed from Souda Bay, Crete to be towed to Turkey for scrapping.

References

External links 
 
 USS Corry Association website
 

Gearing-class destroyers of the United States Navy
Ships built in Orange, Texas
1945 ships
World War II destroyers of the United States
Cold War destroyers of the United States
Gearing-class destroyers of the Hellenic Navy
Vietnam War destroyers of the United States